Christina Schmidt, sometimes credited as Chrissy Schmidt, is a Canadian actress and model.

Biography
Schmidt was born and raised in the Kitchener-Waterloo area and currently resides in Bradford, Ontario. She took acting classes with television actor Dean Armstrong, known in the United States for his participation on Showtime's series Queer as Folk. She trained before becoming an actress, with Kids on Camera and The Second City, two prestigious training companies for aspiring actors. Her classes led to her first appearance, in the 2000 short film Notes from Mother.

Her big break came when she was hired to play Terri McGreggor in the Canadian television hit Degrassi: The Next Generation which aired on The N in the United States. The role was a challenge for the teenage Schmidt, because the character is insecure about her self-image and appearance, and becomes entangled in an abusive relationship.

Schmidt was credited as a series regular on Degrassi in the first three seasons (2001–2004). After that, she left the show to continue her career in modeling. Her character, Terri, had left due to fear of her abusive boyfriend Rick, who had put her in a coma near the end of the third season.

Schmidt is represented in fashion and print modelling by B&M Models in Toronto. She appeared in the fall 2007 ad campaign for MXM, a Canadian junior plus-size clothing line. She has modelled for Torrid, and currently appears in the campaigns for Nygard. She also stars as one of the professional runway models in the show How To Look Good Naked Canada on the W Network.

Awards
At the 2005 Young Artist Awards in Los Angeles, Schmidt won the award for "Best Performance in a TV Series (Comedy or Drama) - Supporting Young Actress" for her role as Terri on Degrassi: The Next Generation.

External links

Interview in Ontario newspaper (Oct. 13 2007)

Year of birth missing (living people)
Canadian child actresses
Canadian film actresses
Female models from Ontario
Canadian television actresses
Living people
Canadian people of German descent
People from Waterloo, Ontario
Plus-size models
Actresses from Ontario